Abraham Wildey Robarts (1779–1858), of Hill Street, Berkeley Square, Middlesex, was an English politician and banker.

Life
From a political family, he was the son of Abraham Roberts and his wife Sabine Tierney, sister of George Tierney; and brother of George James Robarts and William Tierney Robarts. In early life he was a writer for the East India Company in Canton. He became a director of the East India Company, also a partner in the bank Robarts & Curtis, and worked as a West Indies factor.

Robarts was a Member (MP) of the Parliament of the United Kingdom for Maidstone from 1818 to 1837.

In 1825 he was a director of the New Zealand Company, a venture chaired by the wealthy John George Lambton, Whig MP (and later 1st Earl of Durham), that made the first attempt to colonise New Zealand.

According to the Legacies of British Slave-Ownership at the University College London, Roberts was awarded a payment as a slave trader in the aftermath of the Slavery Abolition Act 1833 with the Slave Compensation Act 1837. The British Government took out a £15 million loan (worth £ in ) with interest from Nathan Mayer Rothschild and Moses Montefiore which was subsequently paid off by the British taxpayers (ending in 2015). Robarts was associated with four different claims, he owned 566 slaves in Jamaica and Dominica and received a £11,023 payment at the time (worth £ in ).

Family
Robarts married Charlotte Anne Wilkinson in 1808. From 1827 to 1857 he resided at Parkstead House.

References

1779 births
1858 deaths
People from the City of Westminster
Members of the Parliament of the United Kingdom for English constituencies
UK MPs 1818–1820
UK MPs 1820–1826
UK MPs 1826–1830
UK MPs 1830–1831
UK MPs 1831–1832
UK MPs 1832–1835
UK MPs 1835–1837
British slave owners
Recipients of payments from the Slavery Abolition Act 1833